The Pleiades are a volcanic group in northern Victoria Land of Antarctica. Two other named cones are Alcyone Cone and Taygete Cone, the latter of which has been radiometrically dated to have erupted during the Holocene. A number of tephra layers across Antarctica have been attributed to eruptions of this volcanic group, including several that may have occurred within the last few hundred years.

Geography and geomorphology 

The volcanoes are located between Evans Neve and the beginning of Mariner Glacier, which drains Evans Neve southeastwards towards the Ross Sea. The volcanic group is named after the Pleiades star cluster in the constellation Taurus; the name was assigned to them by the New Zealand Geological Survey Antarctic Expedition.

Mount Atlas and Mount Pleiones form a compound stratovolcano which is the principal volcano of The Pleiades. Dykes, lava and scoria flows are found on these cones, the youngest of which has a semicircular crater. and scoria cones dot its flanks. At the foot of Mount Atlas are moraines with the form of ridges and there are moraines within one of its craters as well. The summit of Mount Pleiones features nested craters.

It is only slightly lower than Mount Atlas but is much smaller. It has two poorly defined craters and consists of lava flows covered with scree and volcanic bombs when not buried under snow. Apart from the lava flows which make up most of Mount Atlas, pyroclastic rocks have been encountered at The Pleiades. The other cones are partly buried by snow and some have breached or otherwise eroded craters.

The volcanoes have alternatively been described as eroded or uneroded. The young appearance of the edifices indicates a young age of The Pleiades volcanoes. The volcanoes have been prospected for the possibility to generate geothermal energy but the presence of a good heat source is unlikely. An aeromagnetic anomaly has been correlated to the volcano group.

Geology 

The Pleiades belong to the McMurdo Volcanic Group and more specifically to the Melbourne volcanic province, which extends from Mount Melbourne to The Pleiades and Malta Plateau. These consist of the Cenozoic volcanoes of northern Victoria Land which form alignments and lineaments possibly controlled by deep fractures, and which are subdivided into a "Central Suite" consisting of large stratovolcanoes and a "Local Suite" consisting of other volcanic centres. Among the volcanoes of the McMurdo Volcanic Group are the large volcanoes Mount Overlord, Mount Melbourne and in the area of The Pleiades the Malta Plateau. Volcanic activity began about 107 million years ago. Earlier volcanic activity began during the Cretaceous, when the West Antarctic Rift System became active.

The basement underneath the volcanoes consists of Precambrian and Paleozoic sedimentary and intrusive rocks. The former are mostly represented by the Bowers Group/Bowers Supergroup and the Robertson Bay Group north of the volcanic complex and the latter by the Granite Harbour and Admiralty Intrusives mostly south of the volcanic complex. A major local fault system passes northeast of the volcanoes and roughly follows the path of the Mariner Glacier, while the Lanternman Fault passes southwest of them. Some of these faults formed during the Ross Orogeny, when three terranes collided to form northern Victoria Land; The Pleiades are located on the Bowers Terrane. Faults may also govern the position of The Pleiades volcanoes.

Composition 

Basanite, basalt, benmoreite, hawaiite, phonolite, trachyandesite, trachyte and tristanite have been recovered from The Pleiades. These volcanic rocks define two separate sodium and potassium-rich magma suites and may originate from separate levels of the same magma chamber or through fractional crystallization. Ultimately, these magmas originate from a metasomatized mantle and were altered through assimilation of crustal material as they ascended. Overall, these volcanic rocks define one of the most complete magmatic series of the McMurdo Volcanic Group. It is possible that the volcanoes first erupted trachyte and later basalts, but later findings indicate that the two suites were erupted simultaneously. Phenocrysts include anorthoclase, apatite, augite, biotite, kaersutite, magnetite, oligoclase and olivine. Essexite, granodiorite, granite and syenite xenoliths also occur. Hydrothermal alteration at Taygete Cone has produced hematite and sulfur which coat and stain bleached trachyte.

Eruption history 

The oldest dated rocks are 847,000 ± 12,000 years old. Eruptions took place about 825,000 years ago and emplaced trachytes in the central part of the field; even older eruptions may have occurred but are now buried underneath of snow and ice. Three more eruptions occurred in the subsequent 700,000 years before activity began to increase after 100,000 years. Potassium-argon dating has yielded imprecise ages of 40,000 ± 50,000 for Mount Atlas and 20,000 ± 40,000 and 12,000 ± 40,000 for other volcanic cones. Later argon-argon dating has yielded ages of less than 100,000 years for lavas on Mount Atlas and for a lava east of Taygete, and ages of about 45,000 years for Alcyone and two more lava flows on Mount Atlas. The Pleiones-Atlas complex may have last erupted 20,000 ± 7,000 years ago.

Tephra deposits have been found in Antarctica which may originate at The Pleiades. These include:
 Eemian-age tephras in Taylor Glacier and Talos Dome, although some of the latter may originate at Mount Rittmann instead. 
 One tephra layer emplaced about 50,000 years ago at a blue-ice area at Frontier Mountain. 
Several tens of thousands of years old tephra layers at Lewis Cliff/Beardmore Glacier probably originate at The Pleiades.
 26,00022,000 years old tephra in the Ross Sea, which was emplaced when part of the Ross Sea was ice-free. 
 16,00015,000 years old tephra layers in Talos Dome. 
 Tephra layers at Hercules Neve and Talos Dome, of probably Holocene age.
 A volcanic glass layer at Siple Dome dated to 12861292 AD. A tephra layer from 1254 AD was later correlated to Mount Rittmann.
 Tephras in ice cores that date to 17761885 AD, including one tephra layer at Siple Dome dated to about 1809. 
 Finally, a major eruption may have occurred either at The Pleiades or at Mount Melbourne between 1880–1980.

The youngest ages of 6,000 ± 6,000 and 3,000 ± 14,000 years ago have been obtained on Taygete, which together with the youthful texture of this dome indicates a young age for The Pleiades, despite the imprecise dates. The presence of pumice lapilli has been taken as evidence of very recent activity in the form of a moderate pumice eruption. Presently, only minor fumarolic activity has been reported. Future eruptions are possible and The Pleiades are not monitored, but they are also remote from any research station.

See also
 List of volcanoes in Antarctica

References

Sources
 
 
 

 
 
 
 
 

Stratovolcanoes
Volcanoes of Victoria Land
Active volcanoes
Pennell Coast